Cardinal Bartolomeo dei Principi Ruspoli (25 October 1697 – 21 May 1741)

Titles held 

Son of Prince Francesco Maria Marescotti Ruspoli, 1st Prince of Cerveteri and wife Isabella Cesi dei Duchi di Acquasparta, maternal niece of Pope Innocent XIII.

Knight of the Sovereign Military Order of Malta.

Protonotary Apostolic since 1718.

Governatore del Conclave in 1721.

Segretario del Memoriale since 1721.

Segretario of the Congregation for the Evangelization of Peoples since 1724.

Ordained Cardinal of the Roman Catholic Church by Pope Clement XII on 2 October 1730 (with the title of Santi Cosma e Damiano from 22 November 1730).

Gran Priore of the Ordine di San Giovanni di Gerusalemme since 1731.

Sources 
 
 Galeazzo Ruspoli, I Ruspoli, Published by Gremese 2001.

1697 births
1741 deaths
Bartolomeo
18th-century Italian cardinals
Italian untitled nobility
Knights of Malta
Clergy from Rome